Suzhou Synta Optical Technology Co., Ltd. is a Chinese company located in Suzhou, Jiangsu, China, the primary manufacturing subsidiary of Synta Technology Corporation of Taiwan. It produces telescopes and astronomical equipment like mounts and eyepieces for the amateur astronomical market.

Company history

The company was founded in 1988 as Synta Optics, at first producing only eyepieces. In 1992, the manufacturing was moved to Suzhou (Jiangsu) in China. Their first telescopes (4.5“ (114 mm) -Newtonians) were distributed by Celestron and Tasco. In 1993, the first refracting telescopes were produced.

In 1999, the brand Sky-Watcher was established by Synta Taiwan to sell optics produced by Suzhou Synta. The head office was in Richmond, British Columbia, Canada. The brand is distributed in Canada and Europe and, in the late 2000s, extended to the U.S. market. Products produced by Suzhou Synta are also distributed under the Acuter name and via the Synta Taiwan owned subsidiary company Celestron. Suzhou Synta also manufactures products for Orion Telescopes & Binoculars.

References

External links
 Suzhou Synta Optical Technology Co., Ltd. english website

Telescope manufacturers
Manufacturing companies based in Suzhou
Manufacturing companies established in 1992
Chinese companies established in 1992